This is an overview of chipsets sold under the AMD brand, manufactured before May 2004 by the company itself, before the adoption of open platform approach as well as chipsets manufactured by ATI Technologies after October 2006 as the completion of the ATI acquisition.

North- and Southbridges

Northbridges

AMD-xxx

A-Link Express II 
A-Link Express and A-Link Express II are essentially PCIe 1.1 x4 lanes.

See Comparison of ATI Chipsets for the comparison of chipsets sold under the ATI brand for AMD processors, before AMD's acquisition of ATI.

A-Link Express III 
A-Link Express III is essentially PCIe 2.0 x4 lanes.

Southbridges

AMD-xxx 

1 Parallel ATA, also known as Enhanced IDE supports up to 2 devices per channel.

A-Link Express 
 All models support eSATA implementations of available SATA channels.

1 Parallel ATA, also known as Enhanced IDE supports up to 2 devices per channel.

Fusion controller hubs (FCH) 
For AMD APU models from 2011 until 2016. AMD is marketing their chipsets as Fusion Controller Hubs (FCH), implementing it across their product range in 2017 alongside the release of the Zen architecture. Before then, only APUs used FCHs, while their other CPUs still used a northbridge and southbridge. The Fusion Controller Hubs are similar in function to Intel's Platform Controller Hub.

Secure Digital:

Codename:

UMI:

AM4 chipsets 
There are currently 3 generations of AM4-based chipsets on the market. Models beginning with the numeral "3" are representatives of the first generation, those with "4" the second generation, etc.

In addition to their traditional chipsets, AMD offers chipsets with "processor-direct access", exclusively through OEM partners. Enthusiast publication igor'sLAB obtained leaked documents about an AMD "Knoll Activator" that enables "activating... processor I/O and processor features in the absence of an alternative AMD chipset." It is concluded that motherboards with the Knoll Activator would be built with I/O from the processor and low-cost I/O chips. 

Individual chipset models differ in the number of PCI Express lanes, USB ports, and SATA connectors, as well as supported technologies; the table below shows these differences.

The 300 series, 400 series, and the B550 chipsets are designed in collaboration with ASMedia and the family is codenamed Promontory. The X570 is designed by AMD with IP licensed from ASMedia and other companies and is codenamed Bixby. Network interface controller, Wi-Fi, and Bluetooth are provided by external chips connected to the chipset through PCIe or USB. All 300 series chipsets are made using 55 nm lithography. The X570 chipset is a repurposed Matisse/Vermeer IO die made using the 14 nm Global Foundries process.

TR4 chipsets 
Supports both 1st and 2nd generation AMD Ryzen Threadripper processors.

sTRX4 chipsets 
Supports 3rd generation AMD Ryzen Threadripper (3960X to 3990X) processors.

Although the X399, TRX40 and WRX80 motherboards' CPU sockets use the same number of pins, the sockets are incompatible with each other due to ID pins and no-connects of some pins. Twelve TRX40 motherboards were released at launch in Novemober 2019. The TRX40 chipset does not support the HD Audio interface on its own, so motherboard vendors must include a USB audio device or a PCIe audio device on TRX40 motherboards to integrate audio codecs.

sWRX8 chipsets 
Supports 3rd (3900WX) and 4th generation (5900WX) AMD Ryzen Threadripper Pro processors.

Although the X399, TRX40 and WRX80 motherboards' CPU sockets use the same number of pins, the sockets are incompatible with each other due to ID pins and no-connects of some pins. Three WRX80 motherboards were released at launch in March 2021. The WRX80 chipset does not support the HD Audio interface on its own, so motherboard vendors must include a USB audio device or a PCIe audio device on WRX80 motherboards to integrate audio codecs.

AM5 chipsets 
AMD uses a single Promontory 21 chipset for all configurations that include a chipset. A single Promontory 21 chip provides four SATA III ports and twelve PCIe 4.0 lanes. Four lanes are reserved for the chipset uplink to the CPU while another four are used to connect to another Promontory 21 chip in a daisy-chained topology for X670 chipsets.

See also 

 List of AMD microprocessors
 List of AMD processors with 3D graphics
 List of AMD graphics processing units
 List of Intel chipsets

References

External links 
 AMD Chipsets

Lists of microprocessors
Computing comparisons